The 1930 Louisville Cardinals football team was an American football team that represented the University of Louisville as a member of the Southern Intercollegiate Athletic Association (SIAA) during the 1930 college football season. In their sixth and final season under head coach Tom King, the Cardinals compiled an overall record of 5–3 with a mark of 2–2 in SIAA play.

Schedule

References

Louisville
Louisville Cardinals football seasons
Louisville Cardinals football